The taus, originally known as the mayuri veena, is a bowed string instrument from North India. It is a form of veena used in North India with a peacock-shaped resonator called a mayuri, and is played with the neck of the instrument on bow. 

References to the mayuri veena have been found in Malavikagnimitra, written by the Sanskrit poet Kalidasa between the 4th to 5th centuries CE. The name taus is a Persian translation of the word 'peacock', or mayura in Sanskrit.    

It is believed that the taus was being played and adopted by for the Sikhs by Guru Hargobind, the sixth Guru of the Sikhs.

Origin story 
Bhai Avtar Singh, a well-known taus player and ragi who practiced the historic style of kirtan, tells the story of the invention of the Taus in the following quote: "The taus was conceived by and designed by the 6th Guru, Guru Hargobind Ji. [...] The Guru and his Sikhs were singing outdoors under a tree enjoying God and nature. As was the old tradition, they were playing some string instruments. After a while, the musicians took a rest, and they leaned their instruments up against a tree. A peacock waddled into the group and he cried in the wailing sound that belongs only to the peacock. All of the stringed instruments resonated with the sound of the peacock cry, and the strings started humming. The sound was so ethereal and Guru Sahib liked that sound so much that he said, 'Let us design an instrument that sounds like this-- a combination of the resonation of all the string instruments and the plaintive cry of the peacock.' And that's how the taus was invented under the supervision of Guru Hargobind Ji." (who is the sixth Guru of the Sikhs)

Relation to dilruba and esraj 

The dilruba originates from the taus and is the creation of the 10th Sikh Guru, Guru Gobind Singh. The dilruba was designed to be a compact version of the taus, making it more convenient for the Sikh army to carry on horseback. The esraj is a modern variant of the dilruba.

Construction
The Taus is an instrument whose identifying characteristic is the peacock shape of the body. It is played with a bow made of horse hair.  There are four main strings which are above the metal frets, which are the main strings. Only one of these strings are played with the bow. There are a number of sympathetic strings between the frets and the neck, which provide additional resonance. These are tuned according to the raag being played, in a similar manner to the sitar.

References

External links
YouTube video - Ustaad Ranbir Singh Ji playing taus

Indian musical instruments
String instruments
Bowed instruments
 Sikh music